Molly Parden is an American folk musician based in Nashville, Tennessee.

History
Parden was born in Atlanta and raised in Jonesboro, Georgia. Parden released her first album in 2011 titled “Time Is Medicine”. Parden moved to Nashville in 2013. Parden released her first EP in 2016 titled Sail on the Water. In 2020, Parden released her second EP titled Rosemary.

References

American folk musicians
American women musicians
Living people
Year of birth missing (living people)